Shiddanabhavi is a village in Dharwad district of Karnataka, India.

Demographics 
As of the 2011 Census of India there were 4 households in Shiddanabhavi and a total population of 16 consisting of 6 males and 10 females. There were 5 children ages 0-6.

References

Villages in Dharwad district